Randolph Joseph Woolridge (1 May 1956 – 9 May 2009) was a first-class cricket umpire.

Umpiring career
Wooldridge began umpiring in the WACA District competition in the 1994/95 season.

Woolridge made his first-class debut in 1998 in a Sheffield Shield match between Western Australia and Victoria at the WACA Ground. He made his 12th and final appearance in first-class cricket in December 2001. He also umpired 11 List A cricket matches between 1998 and 2001.

References

Australian cricket umpires
1956 births
2009 deaths